PS Banshee was a passenger paddle steamer owned and operated by the London and North Western Railway from 1884 to 1906.

History
Laird Brothers built her in Birkenhead for the London and North Western Railway (LNWR). She was launched on 30 January 1884, and completed that June. The LNWR's railway locomotive works at Crewe made her boilers. She had electric lighting.

Both vessels were severely damaged. Banshee was assisted in to Holyhead by Irene.

In 1906 the LNWR sold her to JJ King, who resold her to Italian buyers in Genoa. She was scrapped that October.

References

1884 ships
Paddle steamers of the United Kingdom
Passenger ships of the United Kingdom
Ships built on the River Mersey
Ships of the London and North Western Railway
Maritime incidents in September 1889